Shawn A. Keough (born December 30, 1959) is an American politician, serving as a Republican member of the Idaho Senate from 1996 to 2018 representing the 1st district, and the longest-serving female Senator in Idaho's history.

Early life, education, and career
Keough graduated from Walnut Hills High School in Cincinnati, Ohio, but has lived in Idaho since 1979, where she attended North Idaho College and Lewis Clark State College studying business management. She has been Executive Director for the Associated Logging Contractors since 2000. She has represented district 1 in the Idaho State Senate from 1996 to 2018. She was appointed to the Idaho State Board of Education in 2019. She is married to Mike Keough and is a mother of two who are in college.

Idaho Senate

Committee assignments
 Finance Committee (chairman)
 Joint Finance-Appropriations Committee (co-chairman)
 Transportation Committee

Elections

See also

List of Idaho Senators
Idaho Senate
Idaho's 1st legislative district

Footnotes

External links
Shawn Keogh at the Idaho Legislature
Shawn Keough's personal website
 

1959 births
Living people
Republican Party Idaho state senators
Lewis & Clark College alumni
People from Pequannock Township, New Jersey
Women state legislators in Idaho
People from Bonner County, Idaho
21st-century American politicians
21st-century American women politicians